The Campeonato Argentino de Rugby 1986 was won by the selection of Buenos Aires that beat in the final the selection of Unión de Rugby de Tucumàn

Rugby Union in Argentina in 1986

National
 The Buenos Aires Champsionship was won by San Isidro Club and Banco Nacion
 The Cordoba Province Championship was won by Tala
 The North-East Championship was won by Los Tarcos
 The selection of Tucumàn won the "Campionato juvenil". It was a great moment for the rugby of Tucuman that ended the domination of Buenos Aires selection.

International
 The "Pumas" won against France in the First test in Buenos Aires, ma loss the second.

 The Argentine national team go to Australia, were loss two test matches

Preliminaries 

Santa Fè Admitted directly to semifinals, as host of "final-four".

Zone 1

Zone B

Zone C

Zone D

Interzone C-D

Semifinals

Third place final

Final

 Buenos Aires: 15.Rafael Madero, 14.Ricardo Annichini, 13. Fabian Turners, 12.Diego Cuesta Silva, 11. Juan Lanza, 10.Hugo Porta (cap.), 9. Martín Yanguela, 8.Jorge Allen, 7.Alejandro Schiavio, 6.Pablo Franchi, 5.Eliseo Branca, 4.Sergio Carossio, 3.Eduardo Valesani, 2. Diego Cash, 1.Fernando Morel. 
 Tucuman: 15.Juan Soler, 14.Marcos Silvetti, 13.José Gianoti, 12.Julio Williams, 11.Gabriel Terán, 10.Ricardo Sauze, 9.Pedro Merlo, 8.Pablo Garretón, 7.Marcelo Ricci (cap.) 6.>Gabriel Palou, 5.Sergio Bunader, 4.Pablo Buabse, 3.Luis Molina, 2.Ricardo Le Fort, 1.Julio Coria.

Campeonato Argentino de Rugby
Argentina
Rugby